Cladothela is a genus of Asian ground spiders that was first described by Kyukichi Kishida in 1928.

Species
 it contains eleven species:
Cladothela auster Kamura, 1997 – Japan
Cladothela bistorta Zhang, Song & Zhu, 2002 – China
Cladothela boninensis Kishida, 1928 (type) – Japan
Cladothela hupingensis Yin, 2012 – China
Cladothela joannisi (Schenkel, 1963) – China
Cladothela ningmingensis Zhang, Yin & Bao, 2004 – China
Cladothela oculinotata (Bösenberg & Strand, 1906) – China, Korea, Japan
Cladothela parva Kamura, 1991 – China, Korea, Japan
Cladothela tortiembola Paik, 1992 – Korea
Cladothela unciinsignita (Bösenberg & Strand, 1906) – Korea, Japan
Cladothela unmunensis Seo, 2017 – Korea

References

Araneomorphae genera
Gnaphosidae
Taxa named by Kyukichi Kishida
Spiders of Asia